Charles Louis, Count of Nassau-Saarbrücken (6 January 1665 – 6 December 1723) was the son of Count Gustav Adolf of Nassau-Saarbrücken and Countess Clara Eleanor of Hohenlohe-Neuenstein.

He was born in Saarbrücken, but was brought up by Wolfgang Julius of Hohenlohe-Neuenstein the brother of his mother, and continued his studies in Tübingen and Paris.  In the Great Turkish War, he served as an officer in the army of Emperor Leopold I.

When his brother Louis Crato died in 1713 he took up the government in Nassau-Saarbrücken.  That same year he married Christiane Charlotte of Nassau-Ottweiler, the daughter of his cousin Frederick Louis of Nassau-Ottweiler.

During his reign, he promoted the industrialization of his country.  In Warndt he expanded the glass works, which had been established already under Louis II by settling Huguenot refugees.  In Sulzbach, he built a new salt works in 1719 and a graduation tower.  He founded the town of Karlings (now: Carling), which was named after him.

When his second cousin, Count George August Samuel of Nassau-Idstein, died in 1721, he took up government in Nassau-Idstein-Wiesbaden, jointly with his cousin Frederick Louis of Nassau-Ottweiler.  He moved briefly to Wiesbaden in 1722, but returned to Saarbrücken later that year, then moved to Idstein in 1723.  He died there on 21 December 1723 and was buried in the chapel of Idstein.  A plaque in the castle church in Saarbrücken refers to him.

As both his sons died in infancy, the government of Nassau-Saarbrücken was inherited by father-in-law Frederick Louis of Nassau-Ottweiler.

Marriage and issue 
Charles Louis married Christiane Charlotte of Nassau-Ottweiler, the daughter of his cousin Frederick Louis of Nassau-Ottweiler.  They had two sons:
 Charles Frederick (1718–1719)
 Charles Louis (1720–1721)

References and sources 

 Albert Ruppersberg: Geschichte der Grafschaft Saarbrücken, vol. 2, Saarbrücken, 2nd ed., 1910 (reprinted: St. Ingbert, 1979), pp. 195–203

External links 
 Entry in "Saarland biographies"

Counts of Nassau
House of Nassau
1665 births
1723 deaths
17th-century German people
18th-century German people
Counts of Nassau-Saarbrücken